Jordan is a city in Scott County, Minnesota, United States. The population was 6,656 at the 2020 census.

History
The city of Jordan began on November 27, 1853, when Thomas A. Holmes ordered the construction of a sawmill. This establishment gave Jordan its first name, Holmes Mill.

A year after the mill's founding, Thomas's brother William Holmes moved to the site and began platting a settlement. By 1855, he successfully surveyed and recorded his settlement as Jordan City, after the Jordan River in Palestine. Jordan City accumulated some success in 1855 and 1856 with the addition of a post office and a handful of a businesses.

In 1860, the neighboring settlement of Brentwood was surveyed by S. A. Hooper, J. H. Gardner and R. W. Thomas. The two settlements competed until a legislative action consolidated them into the village of Jordan in 1872. The consolidation only helped the settlement and by 1880 the population had boomed to 915 along with a boom in businesses in the village. A few of these businesses were breweries, which became especially successful until prohibition in 1919 temporarily caused their closure.

Jordan was finally incorporated as a city in 1891.

Geography

U.S. Highway 169, and State Highways 21 and 282 are three of the main routes in the community.

The architects and civil engineers known for designing the layout of the streets of Jordan, also founded the neighboring town of Belle Plaine.

Demographics

2010 census
As of the census of 2010, there were 5,470 people, 1,871 households, and 1,428 families living in the city. The racial makeup of the city was 92.4% White, 0.6% African American, 0.8% Native American, 1.3% Asian, 2.4% from other races, and 2.4% from two or more races. Hispanic or Latino of any race were 6.5% of the population.

There were 1,871 households, of which 48.5% had children under the age of 18 living with them, 59.9% were married couples living together, 9.8% had a female householder with no husband present, 6.6% had a male householder with no wife present, and 23.7% were non-families. 18.4% of all households were made up of individuals, and 6.5% had someone living alone who was 65 years of age or older. The average household size was 2.92 and the average family size was 3.35.

The median age in the city was 31.8 years. 34% of residents were under the age of 18; 6.1% were between the ages of 18 and 24; 32.9% were from 25 to 44; 20.8% were from 45 to 64; and 6.1% were 65 years of age or older. The gender makeup of the city was 50.0% male and 50.0% female.

2000 census
As of the census of 2000, there were 3,833 people, 1,349 households, and 980 families living in the city. The racial makeup of the city was 94.08% White, 0.50% African American, 0.60% Native American, 0.18% Asian, 3.10% from other races, and 1.54% from two or more races. Hispanic or Latino of any race were 6.60% of the population.

Recreation
Jordan has a tradition of baseball.

Jordan is home to the Jordan Brewers amateur baseball team, state champions in 1986, 1994, 2004, and 2019.  Brewer Tournament MVPs include: Ron Beckman (1986), John Dolan (1994), Trent Bohnsack (2004) and Joe Lucas (2019).

Jordan is also home to the Post #3 Jordan Legion Baseball Team, which won the State Tournament four straight years from 2005 to 2008. It took 2nd place in 2010 and 3rd place in 2004 and 2009. It won the National/Regional Tournament three straight years from 2005 to 2007 and was runner-up in 2008.

Jordan High School athletic teams have different mascots for men (Hubmen), women (Jaguars) and cooperative sports (Panthers) with neighboring Belle Plaine. Jordan's High School football team won the Minnesota State championship in 1983.

City parks
 Brentwood Park
 Pekarna Park
 Lions Park
 Log Cabin
 Lagoon Park
 Timberline Park
 Holzer Park
 Jordan Skateboard Park (designed by Jared Hunt and John Beckius)
 Mini-Met Ball Park (directly adjacent to the Skateboard Park)

State parks and reserves
 Metropolitan Regional Park System
 Minnesota Valley National Wildlife Refuge
 Minnesota Valley State Recreation Area

Places to worship
 Hope Lutheran Church
 Sand Creek Baptist Church
 St. Paul's Lutheran Church
 Tree of Life Church
 St. John's Catholic Church
 Jordan Family Church

Sexual abuse scandal
In 1985, several adults in Scott County were accused of sexually abusing children, although only one, James Rud, was convicted. The case was the subject of the song titled "Jordan, Minnesota", by Chicago-based noise rock band Big Black, which appears on the 1986 album Atomizer.

Notes
1.See Report on Scott County Investigations, Hubert H. Humphrey III, Attorney General (Feb. 12, 1985).

References

External links
 City of Jordan Official Website  official site
 Shakopee newspaper site
 Jordan Independent newspaper site
 Explore Jordan Jordan Minnesota site
 Nicolin Mansion Bed & Breakfast site
 225 Water Street Creative Arts historic walking tour site
 Jordan Brewers Baseball baseball site

Cities in Minnesota
Cities in Scott County, Minnesota